George Allen Mansfield  (15 June 1834 – 20 January 1908) was a prominent Australian architect of the nineteenth century who designed many iconic buildings in Sydney, New South Wales, Australia.

Life
Born in 1834 in Sydney, his father, the Reverend Ralph Mansfield, had been a Methodist missionary. He was educated at the privately run school of Mr. W. T. Cape and then articled with the architect John Fredrick Hilly.

He married Mary Emma Allen, third daughter of prominent politician and solicitor George Allen, and had seven children. The family lived in Tranby, Glebe, which was designed by Mansfield. They then lived at Oakwood in Bridge Road From 1864 to 1869, and Lynedoch in Glebe Road from 1870 to 1879. Mansfield served as an Inner Glebe Ward Councillor (Alderman from 1867) for the Borough of The Glebe from 1866 to 1878.

Mansfield was a lieutenant in the Glebe branch of the New South Wales Militia, a commissioner for Peace and an alderman for Glebe Council.  Mansfield was also a member of the Royal Institute of British Architects and was the first Australian-born architect to receive the honour of Fellowship. Mansfield was also the founder and first president of the NSW Institute of Architects (now the NSW Chapter of the Australian Institute of Architects).

He died in 1908, and was buried at Waverley Cemetery. He is remembered in the name of Mansfield Street, Glebe.

Works
His many prominent colonial buildings including and ten listed on the NSW State Heritage Register, include:

Churches
 Pitt Street Uniting Church
 Mudgee Uniting Church
 Newtown Mission Uniting Church

Schools 

 Castle Hill Public School, Sydney
 Cleveland Street Public School
 Crown Street Public School
 The Old School, Darlington
 Mudgee Public School (part)
 Newcastle East Public School
 North Sydney Technical High School (1876–1877)
 Pyrmont Public School
 Redfern Public School (now demolished)
 Rosebank College
 Sussex Street Primary School, Sydney

Houses
 Toxteth Park for his inlaws
  Carthona, Darling Point
 'The Warren' at Marrickville
 Coombing Park at Carcoar for the founders of Cobb and Co

Commercial buildings

 Australia Hotel (now demolished for the MLC Centre)
 several bank buildings for the Commercial Bank of Australia, now Westpac
 AMP offices in Pitt Street, Sydney
 Much of commercial building stock of O’Connell Street
 The Darling Harbour facilities of AGL Energy (now Demolished)
 Mansfield House in Maitland

Other
 Royal Prince Alfred Hospital, Admission Block and Victoria & Albert Pavilions (1904)
 History House, Macquarie Street offices for the Royal Australian Historical Society
 Macleay Museum, (University of Sydney)

Gallery

See also

List of George Allen Mansfield buildings

References

External links
Portrait at Institute of Architecture

1834 births
1908 deaths
Gothic Revival architects
New South Wales architects
Australian Methodists
Architects from Sydney
New South Wales local councillors
Public servants of New South Wales
Burials at Waverley Cemetery